The Miller–Urey experiment (or Miller experiment) is a famous chemistry experiment that simulated the conditions thought at the time (1952) to be present in the atmosphere of the early, prebiotic Earth, in order to test the hypothesis of the chemical origin of life under those conditions. The experiment used water (H2O), methane (CH4), ammonia (NH3), hydrogen (H2), and an electric arc (the latter simulating hypothesized lightning). 

At the time, it supported Alexander Oparin's and J. B. S. Haldane's hypothesis that the hypothesized conditions on the primitive Earth favored chemical reactions that synthesized more complex organic compounds from simpler inorganic precursors. One of the most famous experiments of all time, it is considered to be groundbreaking, and to be the classic experiment investigating abiogenesis. It was performed in 1953 by Stanley Miller, supervised by Harold Urey at the University of Chicago, and published the following year.

After Miller's death in 2007, scientists examining sealed vials preserved from the original experiments were able to show that there were actually well over 20 different amino acids produced in Miller's original experiments. That is considerably more than what Miller originally reported, and more than the 20 that naturally occur in the genetic code. More recent evidence suggests that Earth's original atmosphere might have had a composition different from the gas used in the Miller experiment, but prebiotic experiments continue to produce racemic mixtures of simple-to-complex compounds—such as cyanide—under varying conditions.

Experiment 

Methane (CH4), water (H2O), ammonia (NH3), and hydrogen (H2) were all sealed together inside a sterile 5-liter glass flask connected to a 500 ml flask half-full of  water. The water in the smaller flask was heated to induce evaporation, and the water vapor was allowed to enter the larger flask. A continuous electrical spark was discharged between a pair of electrodes in the larger flask. The spark passed through the mixture of gases and water vapor, simulating lightning in the hypothesized primordial atmosphere of the earth. Then the apparatus was cooled so that the water condensed and trickled into a U-shaped trap at the bottom.

After a day, the solution that had collected at the trap was pink, and after a week of continuous operation the solution was a deep red and turbid. The boiling flask was then removed, and mercuric chloride was added to prevent microbial contamination. The reaction was stopped by adding barium hydroxide and sulfuric acid, and evaporated to remove impurities. Using paper chromatography, Miller identified five amino acids present in the solution: glycine, α-alanine and β-alanine were positively identified, while aspartic acid and α-aminobutyric acid (AABA) were less certain, due to the spots being faint.

In a 1996 interview, Stanley Miller recollected his lifelong experiments following his original work and stated: "Just turning on the spark in a basic pre-biotic experiment will yield 11 out of 20 amino acids."

The original experiment remained in 2017 under the care of Miller and Urey's former student Jeffrey Bada, a professor at the UCSD, Scripps Institution of Oceanography.  , the apparatus used to conduct the experiment was on display at the Denver Museum of Nature and Science.

Chemistry of experiment
One-step reactions among the mixture components can produce hydrogen cyanide (HCN), formaldehyde (CH2O), and other active intermediate compounds (acetylene, cyanoacetylene, etc.):

 CO2 → CO + [O] (atomic oxygen)
 CH4 + 2[O] → CH2O + H2O
 CO + NH3 → HCN + H2O
 CH4 + NH3 → HCN + 3H2 (BMA process)

The formaldehyde, ammonia, and HCN then react by Strecker synthesis to form amino acids and other biomolecules:

 CH2O + HCN + NH3 → NH2-CH2-CN + H2O
 NH2-CH2-CN + 2H2O → NH3 + NH2-CH2-COOH (glycine)

Furthermore, water and formaldehyde can react, via Butlerov's reaction to produce various sugars like ribose.

The experiments showed that simple organic compounds of building blocks of proteins and other macromolecules can be formed from gases with the addition of energy.

Other experiments
This experiment inspired many others. In 1961, Joan Oró found that the nucleotide base adenine could be made from hydrogen cyanide (HCN) and ammonia in a water solution. His experiment produced a large amount of adenine, the molecules of which were formed from 5 molecules of HCN. 
Also, many amino acids are formed from HCN and ammonia under these conditions. 
Experiments conducted later showed that the other RNA and DNA nucleobases could be obtained through simulated prebiotic chemistry with a reducing atmosphere.

There also had been similar electric discharge experiments related to the origin of life contemporaneous with Miller–Urey. An article in The New York Times (March 8, 1953:E9), titled "Looking Back Two Billion Years" describes the work of Wollman (William) M. MacNevin at Ohio State University, before the Miller Science paper was published in May 1953. MacNevin was passing 100,000 volt sparks through methane and water vapor and produced "resinous solids" that were "too complex for analysis."  The article describes other early earth experiments being done by MacNevin.  It is not clear if he ever published any of these results in the primary scientific literature.

K. A. Wilde submitted a paper to Science on December 15, 1952, before Miller submitted his paper to the same journal on February 10, 1953. Wilde's paper was published on July 10, 1953.  Wilde used voltages up to only 600 V on a binary mixture of carbon dioxide (CO2) and water in a flow system.  He observed only small amounts of carbon dioxide reduction to carbon monoxide, and no other significant reduction products or newly formed carbon compounds.
Other researchers were studying UV-photolysis of water vapor with carbon monoxide. They have found that various alcohols, aldehydes and organic acids were synthesized in reaction mixture.

More recent experiments by chemists Jeffrey Bada, one of Miller's graduate students, and Jim Cleaves at Scripps Institution of Oceanography of the University of California, San Diego were similar to those performed by Miller.  However, Bada noted that in current models of early Earth conditions, carbon dioxide and nitrogen (N2) create nitrites, which destroy amino acids as fast as they form.   When Bada performed the Miller-type experiment with the addition of iron and carbonate minerals, the products were rich in amino acids. This suggests the origin of significant amounts of amino acids may have occurred on Earth even with an atmosphere containing carbon dioxide and nitrogen.

Earth's early atmosphere

Some evidence suggests that Earth's original atmosphere might have contained fewer of the reducing molecules than was thought at the time of the Miller–Urey experiment. There is abundant evidence of major volcanic eruptions 4 billion years ago, which would have released carbon dioxide, nitrogen, hydrogen sulfide (H2S), and sulfur dioxide (SO2) into the atmosphere. Experiments using these gases in addition to the ones in the original Miller–Urey experiment have produced more diverse molecules. The experiment created a mixture that was racemic (containing both L and D enantiomers) and experiments since have shown that "in the lab the two versions are equally likely to appear"; however, in nature, L amino acids dominate. Later experiments have confirmed disproportionate amounts of L or D oriented enantiomers are possible.

Originally it was thought that the primitive secondary atmosphere contained mostly ammonia and methane. However, it is likely that most of the atmospheric carbon was CO2, with perhaps some CO and the nitrogen mostly N2.  In practice gas mixtures containing CO, CO2, N2, etc. give much the same products as those containing CH4 and NH3 so long as there is no O2. The hydrogen atoms come mostly from water vapor. In fact, in order to generate aromatic amino acids under primitive Earth conditions it is necessary to use less hydrogen-rich gaseous mixtures. Most of the natural amino acids, hydroxyacids, purines, pyrimidines, and sugars have been made in variants of the Miller experiment.

More recent results may question these conclusions. The University of Waterloo and University of Colorado conducted simulations in 2005 that indicated that the early atmosphere of Earth could have contained up to 40 percent hydrogen—implying a much more hospitable environment for the formation of prebiotic organic molecules. The escape of hydrogen from Earth's atmosphere into space may have occurred at only one percent of the rate previously believed based on revised estimates of the upper atmosphere's temperature. One of the authors, Owen Toon notes: "In this new scenario, organics can be produced efficiently in the early atmosphere, leading us back to the organic-rich soup-in-the-ocean concept... I think this study makes the experiments by Miller and others relevant again." Outgassing calculations using a chondritic model for the early Earth complement the Waterloo/Colorado results in re-establishing the importance of the Miller–Urey experiment.

In contrast to the general notion of early Earth's reducing atmosphere, researchers at the Rensselaer Polytechnic Institute in New York reported the possibility of oxygen available around 4.3 billion years ago. Their study reported in 2011 on the assessment of Hadean zircons from the Earth's interior (magma) indicated the presence of oxygen traces similar to modern-day lavas. This study suggests that oxygen could have been released in the earth's atmosphere earlier than generally believed.

In November 2020, a team of international scientists reported their study on oxidation of the magma around 4.5 billion years ago suggesting that the original atmosphere of the Earth contained little amount of oxygen and no methane or ammonia as presumed in the Miller–Urey experiment. CO2 was likely the most abundant component, with nitrogen and water as additional constituents. However, methane and ammonia could have appeared a little later as the atmosphere became more reducing. These gases being unstable were gradually destroyed by solar radiation (photolysis) and lasted about ten million years before they were eventually replaced by hydrogen and CO2.

Extraterrestrial sources
Conditions similar to those of the Miller–Urey experiments are present in other regions of the Solar System, often substituting ultraviolet light for lightning as the energy source for chemical reactions. The Murchison meteorite that fell near Murchison, Victoria, Australia in 1969 was found to contain many different amino acid types. Comets and other icy outer-solar-system bodies are thought to contain large amounts of complex carbon compounds (such as tholins) formed by these processes, darkening surfaces of these bodies. The early Earth was bombarded heavily by comets, possibly providing a large supply of complex organic molecules along with the water and other volatiles they contributed.  This has been used to infer an origin of life outside of Earth: the panspermia hypothesis.

Recent related studies
In recent years, studies have been made of the amino acid composition of the products of "old" areas in "old" genes, defined as those that are found to be common to organisms from several widely separated species, assumed to share only the last universal ancestor (LUA) of all extant species. These studies found that the products of these areas are enriched in those amino acids that are also most readily produced in the Miller–Urey experiment. This suggests that the original genetic code was based on a smaller number of amino acids – only those available in prebiotic nature – than the current one.

Jeffrey Bada, himself Miller's student, inherited the original equipment from the experiment when Miller died in 2007. Based on sealed vials from the original experiment, scientists have been able to show that although successful, Miller was never able to find out, with the equipment available to him, the full extent of the experiment's success. Later researchers have been able to isolate even more different amino acids, 25 altogether. Bada has estimated that more accurate measurements could easily bring out 30 or 40 more amino acids in very low concentrations, but the researchers have since discontinued the testing. Miller's experiment was therefore a remarkable success at synthesizing complex organic molecules from simpler chemicals, considering that all known life uses just 20 different amino acids.

In 2008, a group of scientists examined 11 vials left over from Miller's experiments of the early 1950s. In addition to the classic experiment, reminiscent of Charles Darwin's envisioned "warm little pond", Miller had also performed more experiments, including one with conditions similar to those of volcanic eruptions. This experiment had a nozzle spraying a jet of steam at the spark discharge. By using high-performance liquid chromatography and mass spectrometry, the group found more organic molecules than Miller had. They found that the volcano-like experiment had produced the most organic molecules, 22 amino acids, 5 amines and many hydroxylated molecules, which could have been formed by hydroxyl radicals produced by the electrified steam. The group suggested that volcanic island systems became rich in organic molecules in this way, and that the presence of carbonyl sulfide there could have helped these molecules form peptides.

The main problem of theories based around amino acids is the difficulty in obtaining spontaneous formation of peptides. Since John Desmond Bernal's suggestion that clay surfaces could have played a role in abiogenesis, scientific efforts have been dedicated to investigating clay-mediated peptide bond formation, with limited success. Peptides formed remained over-protected and shown no evidence of inheritance or metabolism. In December 2017 a theoretical model developed by Valentina Erastova and collaborators suggested that peptides could form at the interlayers of layered double hydroxides such as green rust in early earth conditions. According to the model, drying of the intercalated layered material should provide energy and co-alignment required for peptide bond formation in a ribosome-like fashion, while re-wetting should allow mobilising the newly formed peptides and repopulate the interlayer with new amino acids. This mechanism is expected to lead to the formation of 12+ amino acid-long peptides within 15-20 washes. Researches also observed slightly different adsorption preferences for different amino acids, and postulated that, if coupled to a diluted solution of mixed amino acids, such preferences could lead to sequencing.

In October 2018, researchers at McMaster University on behalf of the Origins Institute announced the development of a new technology, called a Planet Simulator, to help study the origin of life on planet Earth and beyond.

Amino acids identified

Below is a table of amino acids produced and identified in the "classic" 1952 experiment, as published by Miller in 1953, the 2008 re-analysis of vials from the volcanic spark discharge experiment, and the 2010 re-analysis of vials from the H2S-rich spark discharge experiment.

References

External links
A simulation of the Miller–Urey Experiment along with a video Interview with Stanley Miller by Scott Ellis from CalSpace (UCSD)
 Origin-Of-Life Chemistry Revisited: Reanalysis of famous spark-discharge experiments reveals a richer collection of amino acids were formed. 
 Miller–Urey experiment explained
 Miller experiment with Lego bricks
"Stanley Miller's Experiment: Sparking the Building Blocks of Life" on PBS
The Miller-Urey experiment website

Details of 2008 re-analysis

Articles containing video clips
Biology experiments
Chemical synthesis of amino acids
Chemistry experiments
Origin of life
1952 in biology
1953 in biology
2008 in science